This is a list of notable restaurants in Wales. The number of restaurants has significantly increased since the 1960s, when the country had very few notable places to eat out. Today, Wales is no longer considered a "gastronomic desert", there are five Michelin starred restaurants within the country. Other award systems from TripAdvisor and AA have included Welsh restaurants in their lists. The most significant increase in restaurants has been at the high-end, but there has been growth and improvement in quality across all the whole range of Welsh eateries.

Many Welsh restaurants attempt to showcase their "Welshness", but few include historic Welsh dishes besides cawl. Instead, they showcase their Welsh ingredients, creating new dishes from them. There has also been a rise in Asian cuisine in Wales, especially that of Indian, Chinese, Thai, Indonesian and Japanese, with a preference for spicier foods.

Anglesey

Sosban and The Old Butchers, Menai Bridge
Previously a butchers shop and converted into a restaurant which is known for having no menus and so relies on the choice of the chef, Stephen Stevens. It has three AA rosettes rating. Earned its first Michelin star in 2016

Cardiff
The Clink, Cardiff
Based within Prison ground this restaurant is owned by the Clink Charity. It opened in 2012 and employs 30 full-time staff who are inmates at the prison, under the supervision of head chef Mike Arnopp. The Clink was rated 10th on TripAdvisor's Travellers' Choice Favourite Fine Dining Restaurants UK 2015. The Clink closed permanently in late 2022.

Conwy
Kinmel Arms, Abergele
17th century inn with an AA two rosette standard and 2015 AA award for Welsh pub of the year It has also been awarded the TripAdvisor Certificate of Excellence and was listed in the Lonely Planet guide to Europe's 50 best 'secret spot' locations in 2015

The Old Rectory Country House, Glan Conwy
16th century, Georgian, grade II listed building It has previously held a Michelin star.

Denbighshire
Tyddyn Llan at Llandrillo
Forming part of the hotel, the restaurant has been given a Michelin star under Bryan Webb as head chef.  It has also been presented with Wine List of The Year Award 2016 from Good Food Guide, and the AA wine award

Gwynedd

Pete's Eats Cafe, Llanberis
Used prominently by walkers and hikers, this cafe has won the Best Cafe in Wales in the 2016 People's Choice Awards and the Best Walkers' Cafe 2015. It serves basic food such as "chip butties" and "pint mugs of tea"

Plas Bodegroes, Pwllheli
Grade II listed Georgian house that has previously held a Michelin star.

Monmouthshire
The Whitebrook, Whitebrook
Formerly known as "The Crown at Whitebrook" and the inn dates back to the 17th century. It has a Michelin star under chef Chris Harrod and three AA rosettes.
The Walnut Tree, Abergavenny
Opened in early 60's and since then has featured on Ramsay's Kitchen Nightmares and held Michelin stars. The Walnut Tree is now under the direction of head chef, Shaun Hill and the restaurant has since won Great Britain's Restaurant of the Year award, Wales category at the annual National Restaurant Awards 2015, has a Michelin star and three AA rosettes.
The Hardwick, Abergavenny
Country road-side restaurant is owned and run by Stephen Terry who is also head chef. It has been given a Bib Gourmand rating, it got best restaurant in Wales at the National Restaurant Awards and has received two AA rosettes.
The Foxhunter, Nant-y-derry
Owned and previously run by chef Matt Tebbutt, the Foxhunter had won the AA Restaurant of the Year 2004 The pub was then leased out in 2014 and its focus was to return it to "its roots of a pub".

Pembrokeshire
Cnapan Hotel, Newport
Grade II listed Georgian townhouse serving Welsh cuisine.
The Grove, Narberth
Set in an 18th-century mansion it was awarded four Red Stars and a triple AA rosette
Coast Saundersfoot, Saundersfoot
Based on a coast of Pembrokeshire this beachside restaurant is headed by chef Will Holland. It was awarded the AA Welsh restaurant of the year in 2014.

Powys
The Checkers, Montgomery
18th century coaching inn, the Checkers, offers a "set taster menu" and has had a Michelin star since 2012.
Ynyshir Restaurant & Rooms, Eglwysfach
Ynyshir is run by Chef Patron Gareth Ward and his partner Amelia Eiriksson. It has a five AA rosette award the first and only ever in Wales and a Michelin star and was named the 12th Best Restaurant in the UK and highest placed in Wales in the 2018 Good Food Guide.
The Felin Fach Griffin, Brecon
Restaurant and bar which uses local produce has been given the Bib Gourmand in Wales from the Red Michelin Guide, Inn of the Year for 2013 by The Good Pub Guide and has been featured in the Good Food Guide, Hardens and the Good Hotel Guide.
Carlton Riverside, Llanwrtyd Wells
Overlooking the Irfon river the Carlton Riverside, opened in 1991, is run by head chef, Mary Ann Gilchrist. It has previously had a Michelin star and three AA rosettes.
Llangoed Hall, Brecon
Grade II listed building with features retained from the original designs from the 17th century. It has an AA three rosette award and has previously had a Michelin star

Vale of Glamorgan
Restaurant James Sommerin, Penarth
Named after its owner and head chef, James Sommerin, it was "ranked 24 in the UK in the Good Food Guide 2016 – the highest placed restaurant in Wales and was awarded three AA rosettes." Permanently closed in July 2020.

Home, Penarth
Opened by James Sommerin in 2021, the restaurant gained a Michelin Star in 2022.

References

Wales
Restaurants in Wales